Raúl Isidro Burgos Rural Teachers’ College, best known as Ayotzinapa Rural Teachers’ College, is a men’s normal college, located in the municipality of Tixtla, Guerrero, Mexico. It is part of the rural teacher's school system that was created as part of an ambitious mass education plan implemented by the state in the 1920s. Moisés Sáenz was the head of the Secretariat of Public Education at the time of the college's creation. The project for rural teachers' colleges had a strong component of social transformation, which has made it a hotbed for social movements. In that sense, Ayotzinapa Rural Teachers’ College is of high importance to because it is where important figures like Lucio Cabañas Barrientos and Genaro Vázquez Rojas were educated and later on were the ones to lead important guerrilla movements in the state of Guerrero during the 20th century.

Education 

The Rural Isidro Burgos Teachers’ College offers licensing to students that want to work in the elementary education system.  The college is regulated by the educational standards that rule the state of Guerrero and in all of Mexico. According to a survey made by the State's Secretariat of Public Education of Guerrero, in Ayotzinapa there were 532 students, served by 6 Technical Support workers.  The students are all male. The students come primarily from poor families that live in areas with the lowest human development indexes in Mexico and areas with a high illiteracy rate.

History 
Ayotzinapa Rural Teachers’ College was founded in 1926 by the Secretariat of Public Education in Mexico, directed by Moisés Sáenz. These colleges were based on the ideals of taking education to smaller towns, an idea proposed by José Vasconcelos, the Mexican Secretary of Education at the time.
Some of the notable former students of Ayotzinapa Rural Teachers’ College include Lucio Cabañas Barrientos, Genaro Vázquez Rojas and Othón Salazar. Cabañas was a leader of the Party of the Poor, a guerrilla organization with a notable presence in the southeast of Guerrero.
Because of this history of social leaders, Ayotzinapa Teachers’ College is considered a hotbed for guerrilla conflict. Every year normalista students went to Guerrero's capital city Chilpancingo, to voice their demands to the government in protests and demonstrations. They sought changes in their institution, including in the budget for students’ on-campus living.

2014 Kidnapping 

On the night of September 26, 2014, a group of students from this institution hijacked some buses hoping that they could participate in the demonstrations of October 2 in Mexico City. Allegedly, elements from the municipal police of Iguala and members of the criminal organization Guerreros Unidos attacked the group of students under the command of José Luis Abarca Velázquez, the mayor of Iguala. This event resulted in the disappearance of 43 students, 6 dead people, and 25 injured. News of the attack made international headlines with numerous international and human rights organizations urging the Mexican State to conduct an in-depth investigation.
On October 9, the guerrilla group ERPI, Ejército Revolucionario del Pueblo Insurgente (People's Insurgent Revolutionary Army), announced the creation of Brigada de ajusticiamiento 26 de Septiembre and declared this brigade united against the murder of these students.
On January 27, 2015, the Attorney General of Mexico notified about their advances on the investigation on the missing students, clarifying that it was basically an inside job between Guerreros Unidos and the PRD mayor in Iguala, José Luis Abarca. The students were kidnapped, murdered, incinerated and the ashes thrown into a river. According to the official version from the National Attorney, Los Rojos (the rival group of Guerreros Unidos), along with the Dean of Ayotzinapa's Teachers’ College, had encouraged the students to go on the demonstrations against the mayor of Iguala. Due to the confusion and the uncertainty about whether or not they were students or members of their rival group Los Rojos, or a mix of both, the Guerreros Unidos cartel decided to just execute these students as they usually would with antagonistic groups and were supported by PRD's authorities in Iguala, given the constant revolts from the students and their frequent protests.

References

External links 

Official website
Mexico's Missing 43: Mass Kidnapping Overview (January 2015) 
Anatomy of a Mexican Student Massacre
A timeline

Guerrero
Men's universities and colleges
Education in Guerrero
Educational institutions established in 1926
1926 establishments in Mexico